Sir John Warcup Cornforth Jr.,  (7 September 1917 – 8 December 2013) was an AustralianBritish chemist who won the Nobel Prize in Chemistry in 1975 for his work on the stereochemistry of enzyme-catalysed reactions, becoming the only Nobel laureate born in New South Wales.

Cornforth investigated enzymes that catalyse changes in organic compounds, the substrates, by taking the place of hydrogen atoms in a substrate's chains and rings. In his syntheses and descriptions of the structure of various terpenes, olefins, and steroids, Cornforth determined specifically which cluster of hydrogen atoms in a substrate were replaced by an enzyme to effect a given change in the substrate, allowing him to detail the biosynthesis of cholesterol. For this work, he won a share of the Nobel Prize in Chemistry in 1975, alongside co-recipient Vladimir Prelog, and was knighted in 1977.

Early life and family
Born in Sydney, Cornforth was the son and the second of four children of English-born, Oxford-educated schoolmaster and teacher John Warcup Cornforth and Hilda Eipper (1887–1969), a granddaughter of pioneering missionary and Presbyterian minister Christopher Eipper. Before her marriage, Eipper had been a maternity nurse.

Cornforth was raised in Sydney as well as Armidale, in the north of New South Wales, where he undertook primary school education.

At about 10 years old, Cornforth had noted signs of deafness, which led to a diagnosis of otosclerosis, a disease of the middle ear which causes progressive hearing loss. This left him completely deaf by the age of 20 but also fatefully influenced his career direction towards chemistry.

Education
Cornforth was educated at Sydney Boys' High School, where he excelled academically, passed tests in English, mathematics, science, French, Greek, and Latin, and was inspired by his chemistry teacher, Leonard ("Len") Basser, to change his career directions from law to chemistry. Cornforth graduated as the dux of the class of 1933 at Sydney Boys' High School, at the age of 16.

In 1934, Cornforth matriculated and studied at the University of Sydney, where he studied organic chemistry at the University of Sydney's School of Chemistry and from which he graduated with a Bachelor of Science with First-Class Honours and the University Medal in 1937. During his studies, his hearing became progressively worse, thus making listening to lectures difficult. At the time, he could not use hearing aids as the sound became distorted, and he did not significantly use lip reading.

While studying at the University of Sydney, Cornforth met his future wife, fellow chemist and scientific collaborator, Rita Harradence. Harradence was a graduate of St George Girls High School and a distinguished academic achiever who had topped the state in Chemistry in the New South Wales Leaving Certificate Examination. Harradence graduated with a Bachelor of Science with First-Class Honours and the University Medal in Organic Chemistry in 1936, a year ahead of Cornforth. Harradence also graduated with a MSc in 1937, writing a master's thesis titled "Attempts to synthesise the pyridine analogue of vitamin B1".

In 1939, Cornforth and Harradence, independently of each other, each won one of two Science Research Scholarships (the 1851 Research Fellowship) from the Royal Commission for the Exhibition of 1851, tenable overseas for two years. At the University of Oxford, Harradence was a member of Somerville College while Cornforth was at St. Catherine's College and they worked with Sir Robert Robinson, with whom they collaborated for 14 years. During his time at Oxford, Cornforth found working for and with Robinson stimulating, and the two often deliberated to no end until one had a cogent case against the other's counterargument. In 1941, Cornforth and Harradence both graduated with a D.Phil. in Organic Chemistry. At the time, there were no institutions or facilities at which a PhD in chemistry could be done in Australia.

Career
After his arrival at Oxford and during World War II, Cornforth significantly influenced the work on penicillin, particularly in purifying and concentrating it. Penicillin is usually very unstable in its crude form; as a consequence of this, researchers at the time were building upon Howard Florey's work on the drug. In 1940, Cornforth and other chemists measured the yield of penicillin in arbitrary units to understand the conditions that favoured penicillin production and activity, and he contributed to the writing of The Chemistry of Penicillin.

In 1946, the Cornforths, who had by now married, left Oxford and joined the Medical Research Council (MRC), working at the National Institute for Medical Research (NIMR), where they continued on earlier work in synthesising sterols, including cholesterol. The Cornforths' collaboration with Robinson continued and flourished. In 1951, they completed, simultaneously with Robert Burns Woodward, the first total synthesis of the non-aromatic steroids. At the NIMR, Cornforth collaborated with numerous biological scientists, including George Popják, with whom he shared an interest in cholesterol. Together, they received the Davy Medal in 1968 in recognition of their distinguished joint work on the elucidation of the biosynthetic pathway to polyisoprenoids and steroids.

While working at the MRC, Cornforth was appointed a professor at the University of Warwick and was employed there from 1965 to 1971.

In 1975, Cornforth was awarded a share of the Nobel Prize in Chemistry, alongside Vladimir Prelog. In his acceptance speech, Cornforth said:

Also in 1975, he moved to the University of Sussex in Brighton as a Royal Society Research Professor. Cornforth remained there as a professor and was active in research until his death.

Personal life
In 1941, the year in which they graduated from the University of Oxford, Cornforth married Rita Harriet Harradence (b. 1915), with whom he had one son, John, and two daughters, Brenda and Philippa. Cornforth had met Harradence after she had broken a Claisen flask in their second year at the University of Sydney; Cornforth, with his expertise of glassblowing and the use of a blowpipe, mended the break. Rita Cornforth died on 6 November 2012, at home with her family around her, following a long illness.

On an important author or paper that was integral to his success, Cornforth stated that he was particularly impressed by the works of German chemist Hermann Emil Fischer.

Cornforth died in Sussex on 8 December 2013. at the age of 96. Cornforth is survived by his three children and four grandchildren. He was a sceptic and an atheist.

Honours and awards
Cornforth was named the Australian of the Year in 1975, jointly with Maj. Gen. Alan Stretton. In 1977, Cornforth was recognised by his alma mater, the University of Sydney, with the award of an honorary Doctor of Science. Cornforth's other awards and recognitions follow:

 Davy Medal (1968)
 Elected a Fellow of the Royal Society (FRS) in 1953
 Commander of the Order of the British Empire (CBE; 1972)
 Nobel Prize in Chemistry (1975)
 Royal Medal (1976)
 Knight Bachelor (1977)
 Corresponding Fellow of the Australian Academy of Science (1977)
 Foreign member of the Royal Netherlands Academy of Arts and Sciences (since 1978)
 Copley Medal (1982)
 Companion of the Order of Australia (AC; 1991)
 Centenary Medal (2001)

Cornforth's certificate of election for the Royal Society reads:

Tribute
On September 7, 2017, Google celebrated his 100th birthday with a Google Doodle.

References

External links 
 
 

1917 births
2013 deaths
Academics of the University of Sussex
Academics of the University of Warwick
Alumni of St Catherine's College, Oxford
Australian chemists
Organic chemists
Australian atheists
Australian Knights Bachelor
Australian Nobel laureates
Australian of the Year Award winners
Australian people of English descent
Australian people of German descent
Australian Commanders of the Order of the British Empire
Companions of the Order of Australia
Fellows of the Australian Academy of Science
Foreign associates of the National Academy of Sciences
Australian Fellows of the Royal Society
Members of the Royal Netherlands Academy of Arts and Sciences
Nobel laureates in Chemistry
People educated at Sydney Boys High School
Scientists from Sydney
People from Armidale
People from Oxford
People from Sussex
People from Warwick
Recipients of the Centenary Medal
Recipients of the Copley Medal
Royal Medal winners
University of Sydney alumni
Australian deaf people
Australian emigrants to the United Kingdom
Scientists with disabilities